Baselga di Piné is a comune (municipality) in Trentino in the Italian region Trentino-Alto Adige/Südtirol, located about  northeast of Trento.

People
 Stefano Bonfanti, died here on 26 February 2005.
 Riccardo Garrone
 Damiano Tommasi
 Roberto Sighel
 Matteo Anesi
 Mauro Corona
 Giuseppe Gottardi, born here, was Archbishop of Montevideo, Uruguay
 Ioriatti Family, famous businessman and entrepreneur John C. Ioriatti, United States of America

References

External links
 www.comune.baselgadipine.tn.it

Cities and towns in Trentino-Alto Adige/Südtirol